Brandon High School is a public secondary school located in Ortonville, Michigan.

History
The now defunct Varsity Hockey team won 4 regional championships in a row.

Campus

The current building was completed in 1982.

Brandon High School's two previous incarnations are still standing and in use.  The 1973 incarnation became a middle school, and is now Fletcher Intermediate School.  That building replaced the 1949 Brandon School, which became Howard T. Burt and, later, Harvey-Swanson Elementary School.  Burt and Harvey-Swanson combined to take the Harvey-Swanson Elementary School name.  Harvey-Swanson is also the location of Brandon's varsity athletic fields.

Curriculum

Extracurricular activities

National Honor Society 
Brandon High School National Honor Society (NHS) is an organization that focuses on developing and support student scholarship, character, service, and leadership throughout high school.  The NHS is a Society that is selected by a 5-member Faculty Council every Spring.  Sophomores and Juniors are considered for selection based on having a 3.5 GPA or higher.  These candidates submit a Candidate Informational Packet to the Faculty Council.  This packet provides the Council with an overview of students' activities, service to the community, and leadership experience. Once chosen by the Faculty Council, selected candidates are inducted into the Society every Fall.

Notable alumni
Matt Lentz, professional football player
Vinnie Miller, NASCAR driver

References

External links
Brandon School District
Brandon High School
Brandon High School National Honor Society

Public high schools in Michigan
High schools in Oakland County, Michigan
1982 establishments in Michigan